Sanator is an unincorporated community in Custer County, in the U.S. state of South Dakota.

History
A post office called Sanator was established in 1921, and remained in operation until 1962. The community derived its name from the local South Dakota Tuberculosis Sanitorium.

References

Unincorporated communities in Custer County, South Dakota
Unincorporated communities in South Dakota